Ahmed ibn Nasir al-Dar'i (sometimes spelled Bennacer) (1647–1717) was a Moroccan Sufi writer and head of the zawiya of the Nasiriyya brotherhood at Tamegroute, son of its founder Mohammed ibn Nasir. He made six pilgrimages to Mecca and made each of these pilgrimages into a journey of several years. Sidi Ahmed ibn Nasir travelled to Ethiopia, Arabia, Egypt, Iraq and Persia. During his travels he took the opportunity of establishing new branches of the Sufi brotherhood. He wrote a series of memoirs of his journeys called the Rihla (partly translated by A. Berbrugger in 1846). He brought back numerous books from all parts of the Islamic world, which formed the basis of the library at Tamegroute.

References

Nico van den Boogert, Muhammad Awzalî, The Berber Literary Tradition of the Souls: With an Edition and Translation, page 158 - Berber languages - 1997 Edition and translation N. van den Boogert
"A Sous Berber poem on Sidi Ahmad ibn Nasir", in: Études et Documents Berberes, vol. 9 (1992), pp. 121–137
Ahmad bin Muhammad bin Nasir, Kitab al-tarikh al-tariqa, ed. Bibliothèque Générale et Archives Rabat (BGAR) MS/D 2167

Moroccan Sufi writers
Moroccan travel writers
1647 births
1717 deaths
17th-century Moroccan people
18th-century Moroccan people
People from Tamegroute